José María Guido (29 August 1910 – 13 June 1975) was President of Argentina, from 30 March 1962 to 12 October 1963.

Biography

Early life 
José María Guido was born in Buenos Aires on August 29, 1910. He was one of two sons of J.M.E. Guido and Carmen Cibeda de Guido, Italian immigrants. He attended grade school in the capitol, and graduated from the University of La Plata law school in 1940.

Political career 
Guido was elected to the Argentine Senate for Río Negro Province in 1958, representing the Intransigent Radical Civic Union (UCRI). He was elected Provisional President of the Senate and became first in line to the Presidency following the resignation of Vice-President Alejandro Gómez.

Presidency
Following the provincial victory of the newly re-legalised Peronists, the military deposed President Arturo Frondizi but reluctantly allowed Guido to assume the Presidency, with the support of the Supreme Court of Argentina. Guido thus became the only civilian to take power in Argentina by military coup.

Guido directed Congress to annul the 1962 election results and suppressed the Peronist cause again. His presidency was marked by violent confrontations between rival military factions, culminating in the 1963 Argentine Navy Revolt, which Guido's government successfully suppressed. Elections were allowed to take place in 1963 which brought Arturo Umberto Illia to power.

References

1910 births
1975 deaths
People from Buenos Aires
Argentine people of Italian descent
Radical Civic Union politicians
Intransigent Radical Civic Union politicians
Presidents of Argentina
Members of the Argentine Senate for Río Negro
Burials at La Recoleta Cemetery